John Hamilton "Big" John Sears (May 9, 1936 – November 1, 1999) was a NASCAR Grand National and Winston Cup Series driver from Ellerbe, North Carolina, USA.

Career
He completed in 318 Sprint Cup Series events in his career, earning forty-eight top-fives, 127 top-tens, two poles, and five top-ten point finishes. Sears was known for driving his salmon-colored #4 car that he personally owned. He debuted in Savannah driving John Black's #81 to a decent eighth-place finish. The best points finish for Sears is fifth which he achieved back-to-back in 1967 and 1968. He retired after a dismal 1973 season in which he was plagued with engine and mechanical failures.

References

External links
 

1936 births
1999 deaths
NASCAR drivers
People from Ellerbe, North Carolina
Racing drivers from North Carolina